Nemesia violiflora is a species of plant in the family Scrophulariaceae. It is endemic to Namibia.  Its natural habitat is rocky areas.

References

Flora of Namibia
violiflora
Least concern plants
Taxonomy articles created by Polbot